Robbie Bonham (Dublin, Ireland) is an Irish comedian who has been performing stand-up in Ireland and internationally since 2004.

Robbie is also a cartoonist and artist, with published cartoons in English, Spanish, French, Dutch and Italian.  He has worked in radio, presenting a weekly show on Liber8 FM and appearing on many other Irish radio shows.

External links
 Official Website
 Facebook Page
 YouTube
 

Living people
Irish cartoonists
Irish male comedians
1970 births